Anton Vladimirovich Mitryushkin (born 8 February 1996) is a Russian professional footballer who plays as a goalkeeper for Khimki.

Club career
Mitryushkin made his debut in the Russian Premier League on 8 March 2014, for FC Spartak Moscow in a game against FC Terek Grozny.

On 1 February 2016, Mitryushkin signed a contract with the Swiss club FC Sion until July 2019. Mitryushkin left Sion as a free agent after his contract expired on 30 June 2020. Following his release, Mitryushkin joined AS Monaco on trial, before joining Fortuna Düsseldorf on 27 October 2020. He left Fortuna upon the expiration of his contract on 24 May 2021, without making any appearances for the first team.

On 28 June 2021, he signed a one-season contract with Dynamo Dresden.

On 7 July 2022, Mitryushkin signed a two-season contract with FC Khimki.

International career
He won the 2013 UEFA European Under-17 Football Championship with Russia, and he was awarded the Golden Player Award as the most valuable player of the tournament. He also participated in the 2013 FIFA U-17 World Cup.

Later he represented Russia U19 national team at the 2015 UEFA European Under-19 Championship, where Russia made it to the final.

Honours
Russia
 UEFA European Under-17 Championship: 2013
 UEFA European Under-19 Championship: 2015 Runner-up

Individual
 UEFA European Under-17 Championship: Golden Player 2013

Career statistics

References

External links
 
 

1996 births
Sportspeople from Krasnoyarsk
Living people
Russian footballers
Russia youth international footballers
Russia under-21 international footballers
Association football goalkeepers
FC Spartak Moscow players
FC Spartak-2 Moscow players
FC Sion players
Fortuna Düsseldorf players
Fortuna Düsseldorf II players
Dynamo Dresden players
FC Khimki players
Russian Premier League players
Russian Second League players
Russian First League players
Swiss Super League players
Swiss Promotion League players
Regionalliga players
2. Bundesliga players
Russian expatriate footballers
Russian expatriate sportspeople in Switzerland
Expatriate footballers in Switzerland
Russian expatriate sportspeople in Germany
Expatriate footballers in Germany